The TCR Japan Touring Car Series is a touring car racing series based in Japan, the first of its kind since Japanese Touring Car Championship folded in 1998.

In an agreement between WSC Ltd and Japan TCR Management, the TCR Japan Series began in 2019. The competition takes advantage of the success of the class in the Super Taikyu Series and runs on the same weekends as the Super Formula, the most important single-seater category in Japan. The agreement is valid for the next 6 years, until 2024. One of the goals is to attract other Japanese car manufacturers to the TCR category.

Since its inception, the series has also supported the Super Formula Championship.

References

External links
 Official website

TCR Series
Auto racing series in Japan
2019 establishments in Japan